Ennometes is a genus of beetles in the family Callirhipidae. It was described by Pascoe in 1866.

Species
 Ennometes brevitarsis van Emden
 Ennometes cerrutii (Pic, 1927)
 Ennometes cribratus (Waterhouse, 1877)
 Ennometes impressiceps Pic, 1922
 Ennometes incertus (Emden, 1936)
 Ennometes longiramus van Emden, 1926
 Ennometes onoi (Blair, 1940)
 Ennometes ruficeps Pic, 1926
 Ennometes rufiornis (Gray) (type species)
 Ennometes tarsalis (Emden, 1932)
 Ennometes testaceicornis Pic

References

Callirhipidae
Byrrhoidea genera